is a Japanese contemporary artist whose works blend Ainu folk art with industrial design, and is best known for his active promotion of indigenous Japanese art, culture, and history.

Artistic career 
Fujito's East Asian visual art mediums predominantly encompass mixed media, folk arts, and industrial design. The popularization of Ainu art brought about by the 1941 Ainu Crafts and Culture exhibition in Tokyo's Japan Folk Crafts Museum spurred a new generation of Ainu Japanese artists like Fujito whose works continue to garner widespread acclaim in response to the ever-expanding global celebrations of indigenous identities.

In addition to his studies of Ainu culture, Fujito incorporates patterns and designs from his forebears within 21st Century consumer products such as eyeglasses, iPhone cases, and watches in an eclectic fusion of local historic Ainu craftsmanship and modern practicality.

In 2017, the International Festival of Indigenous People in Italy commissioned Fujito to create a monument for the occasion, to which he conceived Ikupasuy.

Personal life 
Born and based near Lake Akan, Kushiro, Hokkaido, Fujito is a member of the indigenous Ainu population where he manages the local shop "Kuma no Ie (House of the Bear)" in the town of Akan. He received artistic training from his father, Takeki Fujito (born 1934), an internationally renowned woodcarver who specializes in lifelike depictions of local residents and animals.

Exhibitions and projects 
Exhibitions
2012: Ainu Art: Storytellers of the Wind - Matsuura Takeshiro Memorial Museum - Matsusaka, Japan
 2020: Special Display: Contemporary Ainu Art by Kohei Fujito - Daiwa Anglo-Japanese Foundation - London, United Kingdom
2020: Ainu Art: Oki Kano and Kohei Fujito
 2021 - 2022: Exposure: Native Art and Political Ecology - IAIA Museum of Contemporary Native Art - Santa Fe, New Mexico, United States
Projects

 Utilization of Timber from Hokkaido
LEXUS NEW TAKUMI PROJECT

Museum collections 
 National Museum of Japanese History and Folklore
 National Museum of Ethnology

References 

21st-century Japanese artists
Ainu artists
People from Hokkaido
Japanese contemporary artists
Mixed-media artists
1978 births
Living people